Nathan Taggart (born 28 August 1987) is a Scottish professional footballer who plays for team Alloa Athletic.

Career 
Taggart signed for Stirling Albion in April 2005 from the Stirling Albion Youth System. Taggart made his professional debut for Stirling Albion on 30 April 2005 against Brechin City. On 14 January 2011 the club announced that he had left the club having decided to take a break from football. However Taggart went on to sign for local rivals Alloa the following month.

External links 
 

Living people
1987 births
Scottish footballers
Stirling Albion F.C. players
Association football wingers
Footballers from Glasgow
Alloa Athletic F.C. players
Scottish Football League players